Night Must Fall is a 1937 American film adaptation of the 1935 play by Emlyn Williams, adapted by John Van Druten and directed by Richard Thorpe. It stars Robert Montgomery, Rosalind Russell and Dame May Whitty in her Hollywood film debut at age 72, who earned an Academy Award nomination for Best Supporting Actress. She reprised her role in the stage drama in London and New York City. A critical success, Night Must Fall was named the best film of the year by the National Board of Review.  Robert Montgomery also received an Oscar nomination for Best Actor in a Leading Role. A 1964 remake starred Albert Finney, although the remake did not do as well as the original.

Plot

Local police drag the river and search the surrounding countryside in a small English village for the body of Mrs. Shellbrook, a flashy blonde who was a guest at the local hotel and has been missing for several days. The authorities question the town folk, including those living in the home of Mrs. Bramson, (Dame May Whitty) an irascible elderly woman who holds court in this small English village. She pretends to need a wheelchair, and impulsively threatens to fire her maid, Dora (Merle Tottenham), for allegedly stealing a chicken and breaking china. Dora distracts Mrs. Bramson by mentioning her Irish boyfriend, Danny (Robert Montgomery), who works at that hotel. Danny comes by to visit Dora, who asks Mrs. Bramson to speak with him. Perceiving that Mrs. Bramson is a hypochondriac who only affects her need for a wheelchair, Danny is charming toward her and says that she reminds him of his mother. He tells Mrs. Bramson that he loves Dora and would marry her if he had a better job. Mrs. Bramson offers him one and he becomes her doting servant.

Mrs. Bramson's niece and companion, Olivia Grayne (Rosalind Russell), is suspicious of Danny, but Mrs. Bramson dismisses her concerns. When Mrs. Bramson's attorney, Justin Laurie (Alan Marshal), arrives to give his client money, he warns her not to keep so much cash in her possession but she dismisses his concerns as well. When Danny arrives with his belongings, he peers through a window and sees Mrs. Bramson putting cash into her safe, but pretends not to notice. Meanwhile, Justin, who is in love with Olivia, asks her to marry him, but she refuses because their relationship lacks any true romance. Justin leaves, feeling dejected. Later that day, Olivia catches Danny lying to Mrs. Bramson about a shawl that allegedly belonged to his mother, as Olivia notices the price tag still attached to the shawl. Even so, she removes the tag so Mrs. Bramson doesn't become aware of it. Olivia, annoyed by Danny at first, comes to feel strangely attracted to him as he challenges her from time to time and even compliments her on occasion.

Dora discovers Mrs. Shellbrook's decapitated body in the forest; her head is still missing. Olivia accuses Danny of the murder, but he denies it. Again, Mrs. Bramson dismisses her niece's concerns as she has grown very fond of Danny. Olivia visits Justin and tells him she's afraid, so he invites her to stay with him and his mother. Olivia first accepts his offer, then moments later declines it, explaining that she is silly for being so fearful.

During the week, locals take tours of the crime scene. Since her house is in the vicinity, Mrs. Bramson becomes a local celebrity, and basks in the attention to Olivia's disgust. A detective questions Danny and searches his room, making him fearful. Olivia feels sympathetic towards Danny so helps him deceive the detective. Meanwhile, the rest of the household does not feel comfortable being in the house while a killer is at large, but Mrs. Bramson feels safe to stay because of Danny.

One night later in the week, Olivia leaves because she's had enough of battling wits with Danny and is afraid with him in the house. She warns Mrs. Bramson not to spend another night there, either. Mrs. Bramson dismisses Olivia as silly, declaring Danny will protect her. The two other servant girls leave for the evening as well. Realizing she is alone, Mrs. Bramson hears noises and becomes frightened. When she screams for Danny, he comes in and calms her down by giving her something to drink, and tries to lull her to sleep. To her shock and horror, Danny suffocates her and empties the safe.

Olivia returns unexpectedly, just as Danny is about to pour kerosene all over the house to set it ablaze. She tells Danny she came back to prove she was right about him, realizing he has murdered her aunt. Danny tells her about his poor childhood, and resenting being looked down upon for being a servant, and states that this is his chance and he is taking it. He tells her he must kill her too, so no one can incriminate him in Mrs. Bramson's murder. Olivia replies she understands he will kill her, but wants him to know she is no longer attracted to him and now sees him for who he really is, a cold-blooded killer. Just as he closes in on Olivia, Justin arrives with the police. He tells her he called them when he could not reach her by phone. They arrest Danny for murder and before they take him away Danny says, "I'll hang in the end, but they'll get their money's worth at the trial."  At last, Justin and Olivia embrace.

Cast

 Robert Montgomery as Danny
 Rosalind Russell as Olivia Grayne
 Dame May Whitty as Mrs. Bramson
 Alan Marshal as Justin Laurie
 Merle Tottenham as Dora Parkoe, the maid  
 Kathleen Harrison as Emily Terence, the cook
 Eily Malyon as Village Nurse
 Matthew Boulton as Inspector Belsize
 Beryl Mercer as Saleslady
 E. E. Clive as Tour Guide

Production

Dame May Whitty,  Kathleen Harrison, Merle Tuttenham and Matthew Boulton reprised the roles they originated in the London production. Whitty and Boulton also appeared in the Broadway production.

In an article on TCM.com,  Margarita Landazuri reports that Montgomery saw the play in New York and  “badgered” Louis B. Mayer into giving him the role. Apparently, the studio was willing to risk a flop in order to get control over Montgomery and his desire for meatier roles. He recalled: “... they okayed my playing in it because they thought the fan reaction to me, in such a role, would humiliate me." The actor also agreed to pay part of the cost of the film.

Reception
The film was a critical but not a financial success. The New York Daily News said Robert Montgomery's performance "lifts the MGM actor out of the lower brackets, where he has slipped because of shoddy material, into an eminent position among the top-notchers of Hollywood players." The newspaper Variety proclaimed that "the appearance of Montgomery in a part which is the antithesis of his pattern may be art, but it's not box office." Louis B. Mayer personally supervised the making of a trailer which preceded the film, warning filmgoers of its "experimental nature."

Writing for Night and Day in 1937, Graham Greene gave the film a poor review, describing it as a "pretentious little murder play [] made [into] a long dim film". Greene comments that the main problem with the film is that it is directed "like an early talky [...] no more than a photographed stage play".

Box office
The film grossed a total (domestic and foreign) of $1,015,000: $550,000 from the US and Canada and $465,000 elsewhere. It made a profit of $40,000.

Accolades
Night Must Fall was named the best film of 1937 by the National Board of Review.

Montgomery was nominated for the Academy Award for Best Actor and Whitty for Best Supporting Actress.

Home media
The Warner Archive Collection released Night Must Fall on DVD (Region 0 NTSC) on December 14, 2010.

Adaptations
A radio adaptation of Night Must Fall was presented on Philip Morris Playhouse October 24, 1941. Starring Burgess Meredith, Maureen O'Sullivan and Flora Robson, the program has not survived in radio collections.

Night Must Fall was adapted for the July 24, 1944, broadcast of The Screen Guild Theater, starring James Cagney, Rosemary DeCamp and May Whitty.

Robert Montgomery produced, hosted and starred in a CBS Radio adaptation of Night Must Fall on Suspense March 27, 1948. May Whitty, Heather Angel, Richard Ney and Matthew Boulton costarred.

References

External links
 
 
 
 

1937 films
1930s psychological thriller films
American black-and-white films
American films based on plays
Films directed by Richard Thorpe
Films set in England
Metro-Goldwyn-Mayer films
American psychological thriller films
American mystery thriller films
1930s mystery thriller films
Films scored by Edward Ward (composer)
1930s American films